The Telos Institute is a 501(c) non-profit organization affiliated with the academic journal Telos. The Telos Institute hosts annual conferences to examine such topics as "social theory, political philosophy, intellectual history, and contemporary culture." Research presented at the conferences is often published in Telos. The current director of the Telos Institute is Marie Piccone, who also serves as the publisher of Telos.

Mission
According to its mission statement the Telos Institute seeks to contribute to American intellectual discussions, but engages with scholars from around the globe to address relevant, yet under-researched topics. The institute achieves this through its annual conferences as well as collaboration with Telos.

Conferences
The 2006 Telos Conference hosted a panel discussion titled "Modernity and its Critics" featuring David Pan, Arthur Versluis, Timothy Luke, and Mika Okajangas. A second panel at the conference, "Post-Communism," included Frank Adler, Victor Zaslavsky, David Ost, and Avi Tucker. Discussions at the 2007 conference featured Joe Bendersky, Jay Gupta, Jeffrey Herf, Gabor Rittersporn, Adrian Pabst, James Schall, and John Smith. Luke and Pan again appeared as moderators. In 2008 speakers at the conference included Bendersky, Luke, Pan, and Pabst as well as Martin Saavedra, Zoltan Balazs, Catherine Lu, John Barry, and Paul Gottfried. Pan, Luke, Bendersky, and Pabst spoke again at the 2009 Telos Conference. They were joined by Jim Kulk, John Milbank, Neil Turnbull, Michael Marder, and Ernie Sternberg. The most recent Telos Conference was held on January 16, 2010 and was organized around the theme "From Lifeworld to Biopolitics: Empire in the Age of Obama."

See also
 Telos

References

External links
 Official Telos Institute website
 Telos Institute contact information
 Donate to the Telos Institute
 Telos Press

Institutes based in the United States
Academic conferences
Philosophical societies in the United States
501(c)(3) organizations